Pokklaw Anan (born 4 March 1991), simply known as Pok, is a Thai professional footballer who plays as an attacking midfielder for Thai League 1 club Bangkok United and the Thailand national team.

International career
Pokklaw was called up to the national team, in coach Winfried Schäfer first squad selection for the 2014 FIFA World Cup qualification. He scored his debut goal against China outside the box in a friendly match. He represented Thailand U23 in the 2011 Southeast Asian Games and the 2013 Southeast Asian Games. He represented Thailand U23 in the 2014 Asian Games. In May 2015, Pokklaw scored Thailand's winning goal in the 2018 World Cup qualifier against Vietnam.

International goals

Senior
Scores and results list Thailand's goal tally first.

Style of Play
Pokklaw is known for his long shots.

Honours

Club
Police United
 Thai Division 1 League  (1): 2015

International
Thailand U-23
 Sea Games  Gold Medal (1): 2013
Thailand
 AFF Championship (2): 2016, 2020
 King's Cup (1): 2017

References

External links
 

1991 births
Living people
Pokklaw Anan
Pokklaw Anan
Association football midfielders
Pokklaw Anan
Pokklaw Anan
Pokklaw Anan
Pokklaw Anan
Pokklaw Anan
Pokklaw Anan
Pokklaw Anan
Footballers at the 2014 Asian Games
Pokklaw Anan
Southeast Asian Games medalists in football
2019 AFC Asian Cup players
Competitors at the 2013 Southeast Asian Games
Pokklaw Anan